The 2009 Florida Gators football team represented the University of Florida in the sport of American football during the 2009 college football season.  The Gators competed in the Football Bowl Subdivision (FBS) of the National Collegiate Athletic Association (NCAA) and the Eastern Division of the Southeastern Conference (SEC), and played their home games at Ben Hill Griffin Stadium on the university's Gainesville, Florida campus.  They were led by fifth-year head coach Urban Meyer, who coached the Gators to a first-place finish in the SEC East, a 51–24 Sugar Bowl victory over the Cincinnati Bearcats, and an overall win–loss record of 13–1 (.929).

With senior quarterback Tim Tebow and eleven defensive starters returning, the Gators had hoped to repeat as back-to-back national champions following their BCS National Championship at the end of the 2008 season.  They finished with an undefeated 12–0 regular season, their first since 1995, but the Gators' 32–13 loss to the Alabama Crimson Tide in the SEC Championship Game derailed their national title hopes, and forced them to settle for a berth in the Sugar Bowl.  At the conclusion of the 2009 season, the Gators were ranked No. 3 in both major polls.

On December 26, 2009, Gators athletic director Jeremy Foley announced that Urban Meyer would step down as the team's head coach for health and family reasons.  The following day, Meyer stated that he would instead take an indefinite leave of absence, allowing him to resume his position as the head coach.  Meyer returned to coach the Gators in spring practice in March 2010.

Previous season 

In the 2008 season, the Gators went 11–1 in the regular season, suffering their only loss to Ole Miss in Gainesville.  Their post-season success included a win over No. 1–ranked Alabama Crimson Tide in the 2008 SEC Championship Game, followed by a win over the No. 1–ranked Oklahoma Sooners in the 2009 BCS Championship Game. The Gators finished the 2008 season with a 13–1 record and ranked No. 1 in the AP and USA Today Coaches Polls.  It was the third national championship for the Gators.

Pre-season
On January 11, 2009 during the national championship celebration at the University of Florida, quarterback Tim Tebow announced his intention to return for his senior season, followed on January 15 by linebacker Brandon Spikes intention to return as well.  With Spikes' return, the entire two-deep of the Gators defense was set to return for the 2009 season. One major loss was All-America wide receiver Percy Harvin, who opted to leave the University of Florida to enter the 2009 NFL Draft.

The Gators also lost offensive coordinator and quarterback coach Dan Mullen, who became the head coach at Mississippi State following Sylvester Croom's resignation.  Former offensive line coach Steve Addazio was named as Mullen's replacement, with Scot Loeffler hired to take on the role of quarterback coach.

The Gators played their spring scrimmage on April 18, 2009, with the Orange winning.

Florida was voted #1 in both the preseason USA Today Coaches' Poll and the AP Poll. The Gators received the highest ever percentage of preseason #1 votes in the history of the AP Poll, which began in 1950.

Schedule

Sources: 2012 Florida Gators Football Media Guide, and GatorZone.com.

Rankings

Game summaries

Charleston Southern

In the season opener, the Gators met the Charleston Southern Buccaneers in Gainesville. In a game that was never close, the Gators won 62–3. John Brantley threw for 67 yards and 2 touchdowns.

Troy

The Florida Gators met the Troy Trojans in Gainesville, Florida.  After a slow start, the Gators scored four times in the second quarter before cruising to a 56–6 victory.

Tennessee

In what may have been the most talked about game all pre-season, the Florida Gators and Tennessee Volunteers met in Gainesville, Florida.  Most of the pre-game talk surrounded comments made by Volunteer's head coach Lane Kiffin.  The game remained close until the end with the Gators holding on for a 23–13 victory.

Kentucky

Pregame Line: -20.5

In their first road game of the season, the Florida Gators traveled to Lexington, Kentucky to face the Wildcats.  The Gators quickly took at 31–0 lead in the first quarter before going on to win 41–7.  The biggest news story to come out of the game was a concussion suffered by Tim Tebow during the third quarter. Tebow spent the night in a Lexington hospital; returning two weeks later for Florida's 13–3 win at LSU.

LSU

Arkansas

Mississippi State

Pregame Line: -22

Georgia

Pregame Line: -16

Vanderbilt

Pregame Line: -35

South Carolina

Pregame Line: -17.5

Florida International

Pregame Line: -45

Florida State

In the regular season finale, the Gators blew by the Seminoles 37–10. A new attendance record at Ben Hill Griffin Stadium was set with 90,907 present.

SEC Championship Game vs. Alabama

In a rematch of last year's SEC Championship Game, the Crimson Tide handed the Gators their only loss of the season. Alabama running back Mark Ingram II scored three touchdowns in the 32–13 win.

Sugar Bowl vs. Cincinnati

Personnel

Depth chart
(revised 12-2–09)

Roster

Coaching staff

Statistics

Team

Scores by quarter

Offense

Rushing

Passing

Receiving

Players drafted into the NFL

References 

Florida
Florida Gators football seasons
Sugar Bowl champion seasons
Florida Gators football